The anime series, MegaMan NT Warrior, known as  in Japan, is produced by Xebec and are based on the Mega Man Battle Network game series. Rockman EXE Beast aired between October 1, 2005 and April 1, 2006 on TV Tokyo. Rockman EXE Beast + episodes were twelve minutes in length compared to the previous seasons and were aired between April 8, 2006 and September 30, 2006. No English localization for the fourth and fifth season are currently planned, but they did reuse some background elements in MegaMan Star Force's English dub.

Rockman EXE Beast used two pieces of theme music: a single opening and a single ending theme. Rockman EXE Beast + did not use any theme music.

Rockman EXE Beast series were later released in eight DVD volumes by Pony Canyon between July 26, 2006 and November 15, 2006. Rockman EXE Beast + was released in four DVD volumes between December 20, 2006 and January 18, 2007.

Episodes list

Season 4: Beast
Season 5: Beast+

References

2005 Japanese television seasons
2006 Japanese television seasons
Beast